Reginald Percival (Percy) Vivian (16 October 1902 – 30 January 1986) was a Canadian politician, physician and professor of medicine. He served as a Progressive Conservative party member of the House of Commons of Canada.

Background
The son of Reginald Percy Vivian and Annie May Brodie, he was born in Barrie, Ontario. He was educated there and at the University of Toronto. In 1926, he married Judith Brewin.

Politics
Vivian was elected as a member of the Legislative Assembly of Ontario in 1943 for the Ontario Progressive Conservative party. From 1943 to 1946, he was Minister of Health and Public Welfare under Premier George A. Drew and remained a member of provincial Parliament until 1948, although he was chief of McGill University's Department of Health and Social Medicine in early 1947.

Almost a decade after leaving Ontario politics, Vivian was elected to the House of Commons of Canada at the Durham riding in the 1957 general election. After winning a second term in the 1958 election, Vivian was defeated in the 1962 election by Russell Honey of the Liberal party.

Cabinet positions

Electoral record

References

External links
 
 

1902 births
1986 deaths
Academic staff of McGill University
Members of the Executive Council of Ontario
Members of the House of Commons of Canada from Ontario
People from Barrie
Physicians from Ontario
Progressive Conservative Party of Canada MPs
Progressive Conservative Party of Ontario MPPs